Raúl Curiel Garcia (born 6 December 1995) is a Mexican professional boxer. As an amateur he competed in the men's light welterweight competition at the 2016 Summer Olympics.

Professional boxing record

References

External links
 
 

1995 births
Living people
Mexican male boxers
Olympic boxers of Mexico
Boxers at the 2016 Summer Olympics
Boxers at the 2015 Pan American Games
Central American and Caribbean Games bronze medalists for Mexico
Competitors at the 2014 Central American and Caribbean Games
Light-welterweight boxers
Boxers from Tamaulipas
Sportspeople from Tampico, Tamaulipas
Central American and Caribbean Games medalists in boxing
Pan American Games competitors for Mexico
20th-century Mexican people
21st-century Mexican people